Gastón Minutillo (born 19 December 1987 in Mar del Plata) is an Argentine former professional footballer who played as a midfielder.

Clubs
 Argentinos Juniors 2005–2006
 Las Rozas 2007–2008
 Leganés 2008–2009
 Toledo 2009–2010
 Pinatar 2010–2011
 Cerrito 2011–2012
 El Tanque Sisley 2012–2013
 Alvarado 2013–2014
 Fénix 2014-2015
 Barracas Central 2016-2017
 Estudiantes de Buenos Aires 2017-2018
 Cerro Largo 2018

References
 
 

1987 births
Living people
Argentine footballers
Association football midfielders
Argentinos Juniors footballers
Las Rozas CF players
CD Leganés players
CD Toledo players
Pinatar CF players
Sportivo Cerrito players
El Tanque Sisley players
Club Atlético Alvarado players
Club Atlético Fénix players
Barracas Central players
Estudiantes de Buenos Aires footballers
Cerro Largo F.C. players
Argentine expatriate footballers
Argentine expatriate sportspeople in Spain
Expatriate footballers in Spain
Argentine expatriate sportspeople in Uruguay
Expatriate footballers in Uruguay
Sportspeople from Mar del Plata